This is a list of protests in Armenia in chronological order: 
1965 Yerevan demonstrations
Karabakh movement (1988–1991)
1996 Armenian presidential election protests
2003–04 Armenian protests
2008 Armenian presidential election protests
2011 Armenian protests
Mashtots Park Movement (2012)
2013 Armenian protests
Electric Yerevan (2015)
2018 Armenian Velvet Revolution
October 2018 protests in Armenia
2020–2021 Armenian protests
2022 Armenian protests